This is a list of Hindi films that have either released or scheduled to release in 2024.

January–March

April–June

July–September

October–December

References